The 1959 Swedish speedway season was the 1959 season of motorcycle speedway in Sweden.

Individual

Individual Championship
The 1959 Swedish Individual Speedway Championship final was held on 25 September in Gothenburg. Rune Sörmander won the Swedish Championship for the third time.

Swedish Junior Championship
 
Winner - Sören Sjösten

Team

Team Championship
Dackarna won division 1 and were declared the winners of the Swedish Speedway Team Championship for the third consecutive year. Leading the way once again for the successful Dackarna team was the three times Swedish champion Rune Sörmander. 

Folkare won the second division. Älgarna joined the league for the season.

See also 
 Speedway in Sweden

References

Speedway leagues
Professional sports leagues in Sweden
Swedish
Seasons in Swedish speedway